Opening Day of Close-Up is a 1996 Italian short film directed by Nanni Moretti. It was screened out of competition at the 1996 Cannes Film Festival.

Plot
Moretti plays himself, running the movie theater he owns in Rome.  In the film, Moretti is endlessly anxious with the wish for his patrons to watch and appreciate Abbas Kiarostami's Close-Up (1990), in the face of reports that other films are selling far more tickets.

Cast
 Fabia Bergamo
 Paolo Di Virgilio
 Paola Orfei
 Fausto Polacco
 Amleto Vitali
 Nanni Moretti as Himself

References

External links
 

1996 films
Films directed by Nanni Moretti
1990s Italian-language films
Italian short films
1990s Italian films